Alexander T O A. Hodgman (born 16 July 1993) is a New Zealand rugby union player who currently plays as a prop for  in New Zealand's domestic Mitre 10 Cup and the  in the international Super Rugby competition.

Career

Early career

Born and raised in Auckland, Hodgman attended Mount Albert Grammar School in the city and was also a member of the  under-18 program during that time.

Hodgman represented Fiji Under-20 at the 2012 IRB Junior World Championship in South Africa, however he changed allegiances ahead of the 2013 edition and turned out for New Zealand Under-20.

Although contracted for the side, Hodgman suffered a season-ending shoulder injury in 2013, so he debuted for  during the 2014 ITM Cup.   He made 9 appearances during his first season at provincial level in what was a disappointing campaign overall for the Cantabrians. 2015 and 2016 were far more successful years which ended in Canterbury lifting the Premiership title and in 2016 adding the Ranfurly Shield to their list of honours.

Impressive domestic performances saw Hodgman named in the  wider training group for the 2015 Super Rugby season where injuries to several front rowers allowed him to make 5 appearances during the campaign, including 1 start.   He was subsequently promoted to a full contract for 2016, but was only able to add 4 more caps to his career total.

Seeking more game time, he headed back home to Auckland and signed for the  ahead of the 2017 Super Rugby season. Near the end of the season, following impressive performances, Hodgman played as a replacement for the Blues against the British and Irish Lions, coming on in the 57th minute for Ofa Tu'ungafasi, in the team's surprise 22-16 win against the Lions.

2020-21
With All Blacks loosehead prop, Karl Tu'inukuafe, suffering from injuries in 2020, Hodgman was elevated to a starting role in the Blues during Super Rugby Aotearoa. At the end of Super Rugby, Hodgman was named in the South Island team, for the 2020 North vs South rugby union match. Although Hodgman did not play in the match due to a minor injury, he was selected for New Zealand's international team, the All Blacks, the following day.

Hodgman made his international debut for New Zealand on the 8th October 2020, in a 27-7 win against Australia. Hodgman replaced an injured Joe Moody in the first half.

In a 2021 Blues game against the Highlanders, Hodgman was sent off, after receiving a red card. Though Hodgman started for the Blues in the Super Rugby Trans-Tasman final, he was not selected for the All Blacks in 2021.

Personal life

Hodgman's son was born in 2019. He has Fijian ancestry.

Career Honours

Canterbury

National Provincial Championship - 2015, 2016

Super Rugby Statistics

References

1993 births
New Zealand rugby union players
Canterbury rugby union players
Crusaders (rugby union) players
Rugby union props
Living people
Rugby union players from Auckland
New Zealand people of Fijian descent
People educated at Mount Albert Grammar School
New Zealand international rugby union players
Blues (Super Rugby) players
Auckland rugby union players